Henry C. Koch (March 30, 1841 – May 19, 1910) was a German-American architect based in Milwaukee, Wisconsin.

Biography
Born in Hanover in the Kingdom of Hanover, Koch immigrated as a toddler with his family to the United States. His architectural career began at the age of 16 when he worked for early Milwaukee architect, G. W. Mygatt. He enlisted in the Civil War with the 24th Wisconsin Infantry as a private, later becoming a draftsman on General Philip Sheridan's staff. After the war Koch returned to Milwaukee, where he formed a partnership with Mygatt until 1870, when he started his own firm.

He married and had six children, including Harry and Armand D. Koch. The latter also became an architect, joining his father's firm in the 1890s and helping with the design of the Milwaukee City Hall.

Henry C. Koch died at his home in Milwaukee on May 19, 1910.

Style

Koch worked in the Richardsonian Romanesque style, inspired by medieval architecture and popularized by Henry Hobson Richardson. The style is characterized by semicircular arches, symmetry, round towers with pointed caps, copious use of stone, and generally simple facades.

Works
Koch's most recognizable work was the 1895 Milwaukee City Hall. Reflecting his own (and Milwaukee's) German Heritage, Koch took his design inspiration for City Hall from German buildings such as the Hamburg Rathaus, as well as nearby Pabst Building (which was razed in 1980). When completed it was one of the tallest buildings in the United States, and it remains Milwaukee's most recognizable landmark.

Turner Hall (1882–83), 1034 N. 4th St., an "iconic" example of Koch's work, resembles a school as it was built during a period when Koch was designing many Milwaukee schools.

The Pfister Hotel (1893), 424 E. Wisconsin Ave, utilizes Wauwatosa Limestone

Koch designed buildings for the University of Wisconsin. He designed 26 courthouses and more than 120 schools.

Other works

 Calvary Presbyterian Church, Milwaukee, Wisconsin, 1870
Stutsman County Courthouse and Sheriff's Residence/Jail, Jamestown, North Dakota, 1883
 David W. and Jane Curtis House, Fort Atkinson, Wisconsin, 1885
 Mahaska County Courthouse, Oskaloosa, Iowa, 1886
 Science Hall, on the campus of the University of Wisconsin, 1888
 Golda Meir School, Milwaukee, 1890
 Montgomery County Courthouse, Red Oak, Iowa, 1891
 Jefferson County Courthouse, Fairfield, Iowa, 1893
 Gesu Church, Milwaukee, 1894
 Webster County Courthouse, Fort Dodge, Iowa, 1902
 The Roosevelt New Orleans Hotel, New Orleans, Louisiana, 1908

References

External links
 Emporis page
 The restoration of Milwaukee City Hall, Traditional Building Portfolio

1841 births
1910 deaths
19th-century American architects
Architects from Milwaukee
German emigrants to the United States